The East Zone cricket team or Islami Bank East Zone is a first class cricket team that represents eastern Bangladesh in the Bangladesh Cricket League (BCL). It is a composite team of two Bangladeshi first-class teams: Chittagong Division and Sylhet Division. East Zone has played in the BCL from the opening 2012–13 season.

In January 2018, they scored 735 runs for 6 wickets in their first innings against Central Zone in the 2017–18 Bangladesh Cricket League. This was the third-highest total in first-class cricket in Bangladesh and the second-highest total in the history of the Bangladesh Cricket League.

Current squad
Players with international caps are listed in bold

Players

References

Bangladesh Cricket League
Bangladeshi first-class cricket teams
Cricket clubs established in 2012
2012 establishments in Bangladesh
Sylhet Division